Helene J. Kantor (July 15, 1919 – January 13, 1993) was a Near Eastern Archeologist and Art Historian in the Near Eastern Languages and Civilizations of the Oriental Institute at the University of Chicago, best known for her work at Chogha Mish from 1961 through 1978.

Early life and education 
Kantor was born in Chicago in 1919 with congenital myopathy, a rare muscular disease that limited her activity and eventually ended her career. Her father was psychologist Jacob Robert Kantor. She attended Indiana University and received a B.A. in Zoology and Biology at the age of 19.  She earned her Ph.D. in 1945 from the University of Chicago.

Research career 
In 1944, while still a student, Helene published an article entitled "The Final Phase of Predynastic Culture, Gerzean or Semainean" in the Journal of Near Eastern Studies. Her most noted work, The Aegean and the Orient in the Second Millennium B.C., was published in 1947.  This cross-cultural comparison demonstrated important connections between the artwork of the two civilizations.

Aside from her primary work at Chogha Mish, she saved the site of nearby Chogha Bonut from destruction by modern development and conducted two seasons of investigation there in 1976/77 and 1977/78.

Awards and honors 
In 1984, Kantor received the Israel Museum's Percia Schimmel Archeological Prize for her lifetime achievements.
In 2004, the Archaeological Institute of America established the Helene J Kantor Memorial Lecture.

References

External links

1919 births
1993 deaths
Indiana University alumni
University of Chicago alumni
American women archaeologists
20th-century American women scientists
20th-century women writers
20th-century American archaeologists